This is a list of Canadian insurance companies.

The top insurance providers in Canada are Manulife, Canada Life (subsidiary of Great-West Lifeco), Sun Life Financial, Desjardins, and IA Financial Group (aka Industrial Alliance). Smaller insurers include those operating as subsidiaries of banks, such as CIBC Insurance and TD Insurance.

Current insurance carriers

 Allstate Canada — Canadian subsidiary of Allstate (US).
 Assumption Life 
Assurant Canada 
 Aviva Canada
 Beneva (created through merger of La Capitale and SSQ Insurance)
 CAA Insurance Company
 Canadian Association of Blue Cross Plans
 Alberta Blue Cross
 Canassurance Hospital Service Association
 Ontario Blue Cross
 Quebec Blue Cross
 Manitoba Blue Cross
 Medavie Blue Cross
 Pacific Blue Cross
 Saskatchewan Blue Cross
Canadian Premier
Combined Insurance Canada — Canadian subsidiary of Combined Insurance (US).
 The Co-operators Group
 Sovereign General Insurance Company
Desjardins Insurance
 Desjardins Financial Security
The Personal
 Economical Insurance
 FaithLife Financial
Foresters Financial
 Canada Protection Plan
 Empire Life
 Equitable Life of Canada
FaithLife Financial
 Federated Insurance Company of Canada
 Gore Mutual Insurance Company
 Great American Insurance Company
 Great-West Lifeco, Inc. — insurance-centered financial holding company
Canada Life 
Green Shield Canada
 Humania
IA Financial Group
 Intact Financial ONTARIO
 Knights of Columbus
 Manulife
John Hancock Financial (based in the US)
 Munich Re Canada
 Primerica Canada — Canadian subsidiary of Primerica (US).
Reliable Life
 Sun Life Financial
 Swiss Re
 Teachers Life
UV Insurance (formerly the Union Life Mutual Assurance Company, or UL Mutual)
 Wawanesa Insurance
Wawanesa Life

Wilton Re
ivari

Bank-affiliated carriers 

 BMO Life
CIBC Insurance
 National Bank Insurance
 RBC Insurance
 Scotia Life
 TD Insurance

Government-owned insurance companies 

 Insurance Corporation of British Columbia
 Manitoba Public Insurance

 Saskatchewan Government Insurance
 Coachman Insurance Company
 Société de l'assurance automobile du Québec

Consolidation of former insurance carriers

References 

 
Insurance
Canadian